Want That Life is the ninth studio album by British new wave band the Fixx, released in 2003.

Track listing
All songs written by Cy Curnin, Rupert Greenall, Jamie West-Oram and Adam Woods.

"Touch" – 4:41
"You Don't Have to Prove Yourself" – 4:11
"Are You Satisfied?" – 5:49
"Want That Life" – 3:49
"We Don't Own the World" – 3:55
"No Hollywood Ending" – 3:53
"Straight 'Round the Bend" – 4:31
"Roger and Out" – 5:07
"Taking the Long Way Home" – 4:14
"Brave" – 3:56

Personnel
Cy Curnin - lead vocals
Adam Woods - drums
Rupert Greenall - keyboards
Gary Tibbs - bass
Jamie West-Oram - guitar

Additional personnel
Erika Rundberg - backing vocals
Jeff Scantlebury - percussion

Production
Producer: Martin Rex
Engineer: Martin Rex
Mixing: Martin Rex
Mastering: Tim Young
Assistant: Albert Pinheiro
Programming: Martin Rex
Art direction: Ed Spyra
Design: Ed Spyra
Photography: Lee Chambers, Jonah (Jana) Hendler, Ed Spyra
Music Video (Single - 'Touch'): Lee Chambers

References

The Fixx albums
2003 albums